FFAR may refer to:

 3.5-Inch Forward Firing Aircraft Rocket
 5-Inch Forward Firing Aircraft Rocket
 Mk 4/Mk 40 Folding-Fin Aerial Rocket
 Free fatty acid receptor